Damarchus is a genus of Asian mygalomorph spiders in the family Bemmeridae, first described by Tamerlan Thorell in 1891.

Damarchus workmani is most often sighted outdoors, and during the month of March.

Species
 it contained 6 species:
Damarchus assamensis Hirst, 1909 — India
Damarchus bifidus Gravely, 1935 – India
Damarchus cavernicola Abraham, 1924 — Malaysia
Damarchus montanus (Thorell, 1890) — Indonesia (Sumatra)
Damarchus oatesi Thorell, 1895 — Myanmar
Damarchus workmani Thorell, 1891 — Singapore

References

Mygalomorphae genera
Bemmeridae